Aporia, the black-veined whites or blackveins, is a genus of pierid butterflies found in the Palearctic region.

Species
Aporia acraea (Oberthür, 1885)
Aporia agathon (Gray, 1831) – great blackvein
Aporia bernardi Koiwaya, 1989
Aporia bieti (Oberthür, 1884)
Aporia chunhaoi Hu, Zhang & Yang, 2021
Aporia crataegi (Linnaeus, 1758) – black-veined white
Aporia delavayi (Oberthür, 1890)
Aporia genestieri (Oberthür, 1902)
Aporia giacomazzoi Della Bruna, Gallo & Sbordoni, 2003
Aporia gigantea Koiwaya, 1993
Aporia goutellei (Oberthür, 1886)
Aporia harrietae (Nicéville, 1893) – Bhutan blackvein
Aporia hastata (Oberthür, 1892)
Aporia hippia (Bremer, 1861)
Aporia howarthi Bernardi, 1961
Aporia joubini (Oberthür, 1913)
Aporia kamei Koiwaya, 1989
Aporia kanekoi Koiwaya, 1989
Aporia largeteaui (Oberthür, 1881)
Aporia larraldei (Oberthür, 1876)
Aporia lemoulti (Bernardi, 1944)
Aporia leucodice (Eversmann, 1843) – Himalayan blackvein
Aporia lhamo (Oberthür, 1893)
Aporia martineti (Oberthür, 1884)
Aporia monbeigi (Oberthür, 1917)
Aporia nabellica (Boisduval, 1836) – dusky blackvein
Aporia nishimurai Koiwaya, 1989
Aporia oberthuri (Leech, 1890)
Aporia potanini Alphéraky, 1889
Aporia procris Leech, 1890
Aporia signiana Sugiyama, 1994
Aporia tayiensis Yoshino, 1995
Aporia tsinglingica (Verity, 1911)
Aporia uedai Koiwaya, 1989
Aporia wolongensis Yoshino, 1995

References

External links

Aporia images at Consortium for the Barcode of Life

 
Pieridae genera
Taxa named by Jacob Hübner
Pierini